Ellio's Pizza is an American brand of frozen pizza owned and distributed by Dr. Oetker, a German corporation, and sold in grocery stores in the Northeastern United States. Ellio's was previously owned by McCain Foods, a Canadian corporation, but was sold to Dr. Oetker in 2014. Although it is not available for sale in much of the country, the pizza brand has remained popular throughout the Northeast since its introduction in 1963.

History 
In 1963, Ellio's Pizza was founded in the Long Island, New York town of Great Neck by Elias Betzios, George Liolis, and Manny Tzelios. Four years later, Ellio's introduced its signature "9 slice" pizza in a box comprising 3 rectangular pizzas, each divisible crosswise into three slices. The original pizza consists of crust, pizza sauce and cheese with no additional toppings. This would remain Ellio's only formulation for almost 40 years until 2004, when Ellio's began selling pepperoni pizza.

In 1988, McCain Foods acquired the Ellio's brand and continued pizza production in Lodi, NJ. In 2006, Ellio's added a microwaveable pizza to its product line, adopting the more common round pizza form. In 2009, the product line expanded further, with the introduction of italian sausage and "Pepperoni Supreme" pizza.

In 2015, McCain Foods announced the sale of its North American pizza business, including the Ellio's brand and production facility, to Dr. Oetker. The brand has continued to expand its variety. As of 2015, Ellio's is available in 8 different crust and topping configurations.

Popularity 
When McCain foods acquired Ellio's in 1988, the frozen pizza brand was outselling all competitors in the New York City, Boston, and Philadelphia markets.  In 2007, despite a distribution limited to the Northeastern U.S., Ellio's was the 9th best selling brand in the country, with sales totaling $34,880,060.  According to Ellio's, their pizza remains the top selling frozen pizza in the Northeast.

Preparation 
The classic Ellio's pizza may be prepared only in a conventional or toaster oven.  In each instance, the baking temperature is 425 degrees Fahrenheit (220 °C), with the pizza baking either directly on the rack for about 9–12 minutes, or on a baking sheet for 14–16 minutes (not more than 14 minutes in a toaster oven).

See also
 List of frozen food brands

References

External links 

Ellio's Pizza official site

Dr. Oetker
Frozen pizza brands
Products introduced in 1963